Acacia aulacocarpa, also known as New Guinea wattle or golden flowered salwood,  is an Australian shrub or tree in the family Fabaceae. It is found in northern Australia, Papua New Guinea, Irian Jaya and parts of Indonesia.

Description
It tends to have a single stem but can have few branches near the base with a spreading crown. The majority of the bark is smooth but it is often cracked and fissured at the base of the taller trees. The acutely angled glabrous branchlets are slender to sub-stout. Like most Acacias it has phyllode s rather than true leaves. The phyllodes have numerous parallel longitudinal nerves. It blooms between January and June.

Taxonomy
The species was first formally described by the botanist George Bentham in 1842 as part of William Jackson Hooker's work Notes on Mimoseae, with a synopsis of species as published in the London Journal of Botany. It was reclassified as Racosperma aulacocarpum by Leslie Pedley in 1987 then transferred back to genus Acacia in 2006.

Distribution
Acacia aulacocarpa occurs naturally east of the Great Dividing Range from northern Queensland to northern New South Wales. Despite the widespread distribution of the species it is not very common as populations tend to be locally restricted to run-off sites around rocky outcrops or along creek banks. It is quite uncommon in New South Wales and only found in the Grafton district. It is far more widespread in Queensland and has discontinuous distribution along the coast and adjacent tablelands of the Great Dividing Range from around Daintree in the north to south of Brisbane in the south. It grows in sandy soils as a part of sclerophyll forest or woodland communities on sandstone.

See also
 List of Acacia species

References

aulacocarpa
Fabales of Australia
Flora of Queensland
Flora of New South Wales
Drought-tolerant trees
Trees of Australia
Near threatened flora of Australia
Near threatened biota of Queensland
Plants described in 1842
Taxa named by George Bentham
Taxa named by Allan Cunningham (botanist)